Hermania scabra is a species of gastropods belonging to the family Philinidae. 

The species is found in Europe.

References

 Chaban E. M., Nekhaev I. O. & Lubin P. A. (2015). Hermania indistincta comb. nov. (Gastropoda: Opisthobranchia: Cephalaspidea) from the Barents Sea – new species and genus for the fauna of the Russian Seas. Zoosystematica Rossica. 24(2): 148-154.

External links
 Müller, O. F. (1784). Zoologia danica seu animalium Daniae et Norvegiae rariorum ac minus notorum historia descriptiones et historia. Weygand. 2: 1-124
 Dillwyn, L. W. (1817). A descriptive catalogue of Recent shells, arranged according to the Linnean method; with particular attention to the synonymy. London: John and Arthur Arch. Vol. 1: 1-580; Vol. 2: 581-1092 + index
 MacGillivray, W. (1843). A history of the molluscous animals of the counties of Aberdeen, Kincardine and Banff, to which is appended an account of the cirripedal animals of the same district. Cunningham & Mortimer, London. xxiv + 372 pp

Philinidae